is a Shinto shrine located in the town of Yōrō in Yōrō District, Gifu Prefecture, Japan.

History
The actual year of construction is unknown, but it is thought that it was built during the Yōrō era of the Nara period. The shrine's existence was recorded during the Heian period, but it was referred to as "Yōrō Myōjin" (養老明神).

"Yōrō Shrine" did not become the official name until the start of the Meiji period a few centuries later.

See also
List of Shinto shrines

References

Shinto shrines in Gifu Prefecture